Wedding Band is an American comedy drama series starring Brian Austin Green, Harold Perrineau, Peter Cambor and Derek Miller. The series ran on TBS from November 10, 2012, to January 19, 2013, at 10 pm EST. It was created by Darin Moiselle and Josh Lobis. Despite positive reviews, TBS officially cancelled the series on January 22, 2013, after a single season, due to low ratings. It was the last project by Tollin/Robbins Productions.

Plot
The series follows four friends who, despite their ups and downs, spend their spare time performing in a wedding band.

Cast
 Brian Austin Green as Tommy
 Harold Perrineau as Stevie
 Derek Miller as Barry Wilson
 Peter Cambor as Eddie Wilson
 Jenny Wade as Rachel
 Kathryn Fiore as Det. Ingrid Wilson
 Melora Hardin as Roxie Rutherford
 Skyler Day as Catherine

Production

Development
The project first appeared on the development slate at TBS in May 2010. On October 20, 2010, TBS placed a pilot order on The Wedding Band, written by Darin Moiselle and Josh Lobis, who also serve as executive producers alongside Mike Tollin.

Casting announcements began in December 2010, with Brian Austin Green, Peter Cambor, Derek Miller and Harold Perrineau first cast; Green playing the role of Tommy; Cambor playing the role of Eddie; Miller playing Barry; and Perrineau in the role of Stevie. Kathryn Fiore and Jenny Wade were then cast, with Fiore playing Ingrid and Wade playing Rachel. Melora Hardin was the last actor cast in the series, she plays the role of Roxie Rutherford.

On May 11, 2011, TBS ordered The Wedding Band to series with a 10-episode order. Guest stars set to appear in season one include: Megan Fox, Wendi McLendon-Covey, Kurtwood Smith, Donald Faison, Ashley Williams and Molly Sims.

On January 22, 2013, Wedding Band was canceled by TBS, citing poor ratings.

Episodes

Critical reception
Wedding Band received mixed reviews on Metacritic with a score of 61 out of 100 based on 12 critics' reviews.  Robert Lloyd of the Los Angeles Times said: "'Wedding Band' plays too long but has a good beat".  In the Daily News, David Hinckley Smith stated the "jokes flow nicely, the music is fun, and the pop culture references will make almost everyone smile." In The New York Times, Neil Genzlinger stated that "Here are two things you don’t see very often: an hourlong television comedy and a scripted sitcom on Saturday night that is worth watching!"

International broadcasts

References

External links

2010s American comedy-drama television series
2010s American musical comedy television series
2012 American television series debuts
2013 American television series endings
English-language television shows
TBS (American TV channel) original programming
Television series by Fremantle (company)